Isabel Montero de la Cámara is a Costa Rican diplomat, born in San José, Costa Rica, in 1942 as the  daughter of Francisco Montero Madrigal and Joyce de la Cámara. After her first marriage with Martin Wolff, she married Manfred Meissner.

She studied philosophy at the University of Costa Rica and acting in Paris. She began work in the Foreign Office on June 18, 1974. and was appointed ambassador on April 9, 1996.

She held office as the ambassador to France, Germany and in the central state chancellery. From 1998 to 2005, she was ambassador of Costa Rica to Switzerland and to Liechtenstein. From 2005 to 2007, she was cultural director in the state chancellery of Costa Rica while remaining ambassador to Liechtenstein. In 2007, she was appointed ambassador of Costa Rica to Russia. Germany honoured her with the medal of civil merit.

Apart from her diplomatic activity she was well known for her acting, being awarded the Costa Rican national prize for theatre.

References

1942 births
Living people
People from San José, Costa Rica
Costa Rican women ambassadors
Ambassadors of Costa Rica to France
Ambassadors of Costa Rica to Liechtenstein
Ambassadors of Costa Rica to Germany
Ambassadors of Costa Rica to Switzerland
Ambassadors of Costa Rica to Russia